Positif is a French film magazine, founded in 1952 by Bernard Chardère in Lyon. It is one of two major French-language film magazines, created several months after Les Cahiers du cinéma. The magazine is headquartered in Paris and is published monthly. 

Traditionally, Positif  has served as a counterpoint to Les Cahiers du cinéma, focusing on film themes and scripts, in contrast to politics and aesthetics. In the 1950s, Positif  was associated with the non-Communist left (while Les Cahiers du cinéma originally held political affiliations with the right). Today, Positif is a neutral publication run by volunteers.

The magazine was edited by Eric Losfeld from 1959. After publishing an article about Orson Welles in 1963, Michel Ciment became a member of the magazine's editorial committee. In 1966, he was promoted to editor in chief, a post he continues to occupy today. 

Positif has been printed by different publishers throughout the years and is currently published by Actes Sud in collaboration with the Institut Lumière.

See also
 List of film periodicals

References

External links
 Official website

1952 establishments in France
Film magazines published in France
French-language magazines
Monthly magazines published in France
Magazines established in 1952
Magazines published in Paris
Marxist magazines